Muhammadyusuf Teshaboyev Mutalibjonovich (born 27 November 1954) is an Uzbekistani politician from the Uzbekistan Liberal Democratic Party. As leader, his party won a plurality of seats in the Legislative Chamber of Uzbekistan in the 2009–10 Uzbek parliamentary election.

References 

Living people
1954 births
21st-century Uzbekistani politicians
Uzbekistan Liberal Democratic Party politicians
Members of the Legislative Chamber of Uzbekistan
Leaders of political parties in Uzbekistan